Svullrya is a village in Grue Municipality in Innlandet county, Norway. The village is located in the Finnskogen area, between the lakes Røgden and Skasen.  The village is regionally important as a hub of the Finnskogen culture. The Grue Finnskog Church is located in the village.

References

Grue, Norway
Villages in Innlandet